Paul J. Donato (born October 27, 1941, in Boston) is an American politician who currently represents the 35th Middlesex District in the Massachusetts House of Representatives. He previously served as a member of the Medford, Massachusetts, school committee from 1972 to 1975 and the city council from 1976 to 1985 and again from 1996 to 2000. While serving on the council, Donato also served as deputy mayor from 1978 to 1979, mayor from 1980 to 1985, and council president from 1999 to 2000.

See also
 2019–2020 Massachusetts legislature
 2021–2022 Massachusetts legislature

References

External links
 Legislative website
 Constituent and campaign website

1941 births
Democratic Party members of the Massachusetts House of Representatives
Mayors of Medford, Massachusetts
University of Massachusetts Boston alumni
Living people
21st-century American politicians